Enrico Donati (February 19, 1909 – April 25, 2008) was an Italian-American Surrealist painter and sculptor.

Life and work

Enrico Donati studied economics at the Università degli Studi, Pavia, and in 1934 moved to the USA, where he attended the New School for Social Research and the Art Students League of New York. His first one-man shows were in New York in 1942, at the New School for Social Research and the Passedoit Gallery. At this stage he was clearly drawn to Surrealism. This was reinforced by meeting André Breton and coming into contact with Marcel Duchamp and the other European Surrealists in New York at the time. A typical work of this period, St Elmo’s Fire (1944; New York, MoMA), contains strange organic formations suggestive of underwater life.

Donati was one of the organizers of the Exposition Internationale du Surréalisme held in Paris in the summer of 1947, to which he contributed a painting and two sculptures. In the late 1940s he responded to the crisis in Surrealism by going through a Constructivist phase, from which he developed a calligraphic style and drew onto melted tar, or diluted paint with turpentine.  He also became associated with Spatialism, founded by Lucio Fontana. Thus began his long fascination with surface and texture, including mixing paint with dust, that culminated in the 1950s in his Moonscapes, a series that has similarities with the work of Dubuffet.  The fossil became a major theme for Donati through the 1960s, and he gave new importance to color in his Fossil works, for example in Red Yellow Fossil (1964; Miami, Hills Col., see Selz, p. 19). In 1961, he was given a major retrospective at the Palais des Beaux-Arts in Brussels and frequently exhibited at group shows in the USA and elsewhere. He held a number of important teaching and advisory posts, including Visiting Lecturer at Yale University (1962–1972).

Death
Considered by some in the art world to be one of the last of the Surrealists, Enrico Donati died in his home in Manhattan on April 25, 2008, aged 99.  Donati's health had been failing since  involved, as a passenger, in a taxi accident in July, 2007.  He eventually succumbed to complications sustained from his injuries.

Museums and collections

The Museum of Modern Art, New York
Guggenheim Museum, New York
Whitney Museum of American Art, New York
Washington University in St. Louis, Missouri
Museum of Fine Art of Houston, Texas
Boca Raton Museum of Art, Florida
Royal Museums of Fine Arts of Belgium, Belgium
Museum of International Center of Aesthetic Research, Turin
Albright-Knox Art Gallery, New York
The Detroit Institute of Art, Michigan
University of Michigan Art Gallery, Michigan
Baltimore Museum of Art, Maryland·Newark Museum Association, New Jersey
Galleria Nazionale d'Arte Moderna, Rome
Mitchener Foundation, Pennsylvania
Massachusetts Institute of Technology, Massachusetts
The Rockefeller Institute, New York
Johns Hopkins Hospital, Maryland
Yale University Art Gallery, Connecticut
Washington Gallery of Modern Art, Washington D.C.
Tougaloo College, Mississippi
Israel Museum, Israel
University Art Museum, University of California, Berkeley
University of Texas at Austin
Museum of Fine Arts, Florida
Tacoma Art Museum, Washington
St. Paul Art Center, Minnesota
The Lowe Museum, University of Miami, Florida
High Museum of Art, Georgia
Doane University, Nebraska
Seattle Art Museum, Washington
Weinstein Gallery, San Francisco, CA 
Vassar College, New York
Swarthmore College, Pennsylvania
Minnesota Museum of American Art, Minnesota
The Hirshhorn Museum and Sculpture Garden, Washington D.C.
Museum of Art, Florida
Orlando Museum of Art, Florida
Housatonic Community College, Connecticut
Arturo Schwarz Surrealist Foundation, Italy
 Gallerie di Piazza Scala, Milan, Italy, magma bianco

Selected solo exhibitions
2007, The Surreal World of Enrico Donati, de Young Museum, San Francisco
2006, Weinstein Gallery, San Francisco, California (Retrospective : 130 Selected works from the Artist's Personal Collection 1942 - 2001)
2004, 2005 Gallerie Les yeux  fertiles, Paris
2000-04 Galerie Yoramgil, West Hollywood, California
1998 Galerie Yoramgil, West Hollywood, California (retrospective)
1997 Boca Raton Museum (retrospective)
1995-97 Maxwell Davidson Gallery, New York
1995-97 Horwitch Gallery, Scottsdale
1986, 1989, 1991, 1992, 1993 Louis Newman Galleries, Beverly Hills
1989 Galerie Zabriskie, Paris
1987 Zabriskie Gallery, New York
1985 Georges Fall, Paris
1994, 1990 Carone Gallery, Fort Lauderdale
1984, 1986, 1987 Gimpel & Weitzenhoffer, New York·1980 Grand Palais, FIAC, Paris
1980 Palm Springs Desert Museum, Palm Springs
1979 Osuna Gallery, Washington D.C.
1979 Phillips Collection, Washington D.C.
1950 Galleria del Milione, Milan·1950 Obelisco, Rome
1950 Paul Rosenberg Gallery, New York
1947 Galerie Drouant Gallery, Paris
1947, 1958 Syracuse University, New York
1945-47, 1949 Durand Ruel, New York
1944, 1959 Chicago Arts Club, Chicago
1944 G. Place Gallery, Washington D.C.
1942, 1944 Passedoit Gallery, New York
1979 Norton Gallery, Palm Beach
1978 Wildenstien Art Center, Houston
1978 Davenport Municipal Art Gallery, Iowa
1978 Hunter Museum of Art, Chattanooga
1977 Fairweather Hardin Gallery, Chicago
1977 Tennessee Fine Arts Center, Nashville
1977 Chrysler Museum, Norfolk
1977, 1979, 1982 Ankrum Gallery, Los Angeles
1977 Minnesota Museum of Art, St. Paul
1965 Obelisk Gallery, Washington D.C.
1964 Massachusetts Institute of Technology, Cambridge
1964, 1966 J.L. Hudson Gallery, Detroit
1962, 1963, 1966, 1968, 1970, 1972, 1974, 1976, 1980, 1982 Staempfli Gallery, New York
1962 Neue Gallery, Munich
1961 Palais des Beaux-Arts, Brussels
1954, 1955, 1957, 1959, 1960 Betty Parsons Gallery, New York
1953 Naviglio, Milan
1952, 1953 Cavallino, Venice
1952 Alexander Iolas Gallery, New York

Selected group exhibitions
2005 Centre de Cultura Contemporania de Barcelona and Museo de Bellas Artes de Bilboa, Spain
2005 National Academy of Design, New York, and Phoenix Art Museum, Arizona
2002 Kouros Gallery, New York
2002 Philadelphia Museum of Art, Pennsylvania
2001-02 Tate Gallery, London and Metropolitan Museum of Art, New York
2001 Portland Art Museum, Oregon
2001 Cultural Center Bank of Brazil, Rio de Janeiro
1999-2004 Galerie Yoramgil, West Hollywood, California
2000 Musees de Strasbourg
1999 Musee National Centro de Arte Reina Solia, Madrid
1998 Bruce Museum, Connecticut·1997 Boca Raton Museum of Art, Florida
1995 Nassau County Museum of Art, New York
1995 Galleria d'arte Bergamo, Italy
1994 Hunter College Art Galleries, New York
1992 Isidore Ducasee Fine Arts, New York
1991-92 Miami International, Florida
1991 Musee National Centro de Arte Reina Sophia, Madrid, Spain
1991 Musee National d'Art Moderne, Paris, France
1990-91 ART/LA, Los Angeles, California
1990 Riva Yares Gallery, Scottsdale, Arizona·Fundacion Cultural Mapfre Vida, Madrid
1989-90 Las Palmas de Gran Canaria, Centro Atlantico de Arte Moderno
1989 Schim Kunsthalle, Frankfurt, Germany
1989 Palazzo Reale, Milan, Italy
1977 Rutgers University Art Gallery, New Brunswick, New Jersey
1977 Nashville Museum, Tennessee
1976 Meredith Long Gallery, Houston, Texas
1976 Ankrum Gallery, Los Angeles, California
1970 University of Texas, Austin
1964 New York World Fair
1964 Museum of Fine Arts, Boston, Massachusetts
1964 Whitney Museum, New York
1963 Allentown Art Museum, James A. Michener Foundation, Pennsylvania
1963 Columbia Museum of Art, South Carolina
1963 Herron Museum of Art, Indianapolis, Indiana
1962 Birmingham Museum of Art, Alabama
1961 Decorative Arts Center, New York
1961 Mary Washington College, Fredericksburg, Virginia
1961 Massachusetts Institute of Technology, Cambridge
1960 Walker Art Center, Minneapolis, Minnesota
1960 University of Colorado, Boulder
1960 Marton May Exhibition, St. Louis, Missouri
1960 Martha Jackson Gallery, New York
1960, 1977 Minnesota Museum of Art, St. Paul
1959 Michigan State University
1959 De Cordova & Dana Museum, Massachusetts
1959 American Federation of Arts, New York
1959 Smithsonian Institution, Washington, D.C.
1959 Rhode Island School of Design, Providence
1958 Gutai 9, Osaka, Japan
1958, 1962 Virginia Museum of Fine Arts
1958 Inter-American Paintings & Prints Biennial, Mexico City
1959, 1957 Indiana University, Bloomington
1955 Munson-Williams Proctor Institute, Utica, New York
1954-55, 1961 Guggenheim Museum, New York
1953-54 Museum of Modern Art, New York
1953, 1954 University of Nebraska
1953 Biennale, São Paulo
1952 Saarbrücken
1952 Architectural Figurativa, Milan Italy
1952 Galleria del Cavallino, Venice, Italy
1952 Artists Spaziale, Trieste
1952 Premio Gianni, Milan, Italy
1951 Third Tokyo Annual
1951 Ninth  Street Annual, New York
1950, 1986 Biennale, Venice, Italy
1948-51, 1953, 1960, 1961 University of Illinois
1947 Pasedot Gallery, New York
1947 Toledo Museum of Art
1947 University of Iowa
1947 Exposition Surrealist, Prague
1946 Albright-Knox Art Gallery, Buffalo
1946, 1963 Herron Museum of Art, Indianapolis
1945-47 Bignou Gallery, New York
1945, 1954, 1956, 1958–59, 1961–63, 1964, 1970 Whitney Annual, New York
1945, 1947, 1957 Pennsylvania Art Academy
1945, 1947, 1956, 1960-61 Cocoran Gallery, Washington D.C.
1945, 1954, 1957, 1960 Chicago Art Institute
1945, 1947, 1950, 1951, 1952, 1954, 1958, 1961 Carnegie International

Honors
1954-56, 1963-64 Member of the Jury of Fulbright Scholarship Program
1960, 1961, 1962 Visiting Lecturer at Yale University
1962-72 Member of the Yale University Council for Arts and Architecture
1970, 1972 Chairman National Committee, University Art Museum of California, Berkeley

See also
Art informel
Michel Tapié
Gutai group

Notes and references

External links
New York Times obituary for Donati
Obituary in The Independent by Marcus Williamson
Finding Aid for Enrico Donati letters received and manuscripts at the Getty Research Institute, Los Angeles, Accession No. 940120. The collection consist of circa 200 letters received from galleries, museums, and artists, four manuscripts, and circa 20 printed items primarily relate to the Surrealist retrospective "Le Surrealisme en 1947" curated by Andrei Breton and Marcel Duchamp and held at the Galerie Maeght in Paris, July–August 1947.

Abstract painters
Art Informel and Tachisme painters
1909 births
2008 deaths
Modern painters
20th-century American painters
American male painters
21st-century American painters
Abstract expressionist artists
American surrealist artists
Jewish American artists
Jewish painters
Italian emigrants to the United States
20th-century Italian Jews
20th-century American Jews
21st-century American Jews
20th-century American male artists